Irina Nikolayevna Korzhanenko (born 16 May 1974 in Azov) is a former Russian shot putter. She gained international recognition when she won a bronze medal at the 1997 IAAF World Indoor Championships. In the following years she became European Indoor champion, European champion and World Indoor champion.

Doping
Korzhanenko tested positive for doping at the 1999 IAAF World Indoor Championships. She lost the silver medal and was handed a two-year doping suspension.

At the 2004 Summer Olympics, she originally won the gold medal in shot put, but tested positive for stanozolol and was stripped of the medal. She later received a life ban from the IAAF in a Memorandum of 21 September 2005. Korzhanenko refused to return the gold medal, despite the pressure of the International Athletics Federation's officials. As of 2023, she has not returned the gold medal.

International competitions

See also
List of doping cases in athletics
List of stripped Olympic medals
List of 2004 Summer Olympics medal winners
List of IAAF World Indoor Championships medalists (women)
List of European Athletics Championships medalists (women)
List of European Athletics Indoor Championships medalists (women)
Doping at the Olympic Games
Doping in Russia

References

1974 births
Living people
Sportspeople from Rostov Oblast
Russian female shot putters
Olympic female shot putters
Olympic athletes of Russia
Athletes (track and field) at the 1996 Summer Olympics
Athletes (track and field) at the 2004 Summer Olympics
Competitors stripped of Summer Olympics medals
European Athletics Championships medalists
Universiade gold medalists for Russia
Universiade gold medalists in athletics (track and field)
Medalists at the 1997 Summer Universiade
Goodwill Games medalists in athletics
Competitors at the 1998 Goodwill Games
World Athletics Indoor Championships winners
IAAF Continental Cup winners
European Athletics Championships winners
European Athletics Indoor Championships winners
Russian Athletics Championships winners
Russian sportspeople in doping cases
Doping cases in athletics